Beryllium carbide, or Be2C, is a metal carbide.  Similar to diamond, it is a very hard compound.  It is used in nuclear reactors as a core material.

Preparation
Beryllium carbide is prepared by heating the elements beryllium and carbon at elevated temperatures (above 950°C). It also may be prepared by reduction of beryllium oxide with carbon at a temperature above 1,500°C:
2BeO + 3C → Be2C + 2CO

Beryllium carbide decomposes very slowly in water and forms methane gas:
Be2C + 2H2O → 2BeO + CH4

The rate of decomposition is faster in mineral acids with evolution of methane.
Be2C + 4 H+ → 2 Be2+ + CH4

In hot concentrated alkali the reaction is very rapid, forming alkali metal beryllates and methane:
Be2C + 4OH− → 2 BeO22− + CH4

See also
 Carbide

References

External links
 MATERIAL SAFETY DATA SHEET
 Encyclopædia Britannica
 Electrochemical Society article
 ASC website
 article in Nature
 NIST government website

Beryllium compounds
Carbides
Superhard materials
Fluorite crystal structure